The 2017 Mississippi State Bulldogs baseball team represents the Mississippi State University in the 2017 NCAA Division I baseball season. The Bulldogs play their home games at Dudy Noble Field.

Personnel

Coaching staff

Schedule and results

† Indicates the game does not count toward the 2017 Southeastern Conference standings.
*Rankings are based on the team's current ranking in the Collegiate Baseball poll.

Record vs. conference opponents

Rankings

MLB Draft

†Rooker had been drafted in the 38th round in 2016 but returned to Mississippi State rather than signing with the Twins.
‡Mangum, a sophomore, will return to MSU for the next season.

References

Mississippi State
Mississippi State Bulldogs baseball seasons
Mississippi State
Miss